Flight for Four is an album by American jazz saxophonist John Carter and trumpeter Bobby Bradford recorded in 1969 and released by the Flying Dutchman label.

Track listing
All compositions by John Carter except where noted
 "Call to the Festival" − 9:30
 "The Second Set" − 8:42
 "Woman" (Bobby Bradford) − 7:10
 "Abstractions for Three Lovers" − 6:39
 "Domino" − 7:57

Personnel
John Carter − alto saxophone, tenor saxophone, clarinet
Bobby Bradford − trumpet
Tom Williamson − bass
Buzz Freeman − drums

References

John Carter (jazz musician) albums
Bobby Bradford albums
1969 albums
Flying Dutchman Records albums
Albums produced by Bob Thiele